Utisak nedelje (Impression of the Week) is a long-running Serbian political talk show hosted by Olja Bećković that airs live on TV channel Nova S.

Airing live Sundays at 9pm and conceptualized as recap of the preceding week's events, the show mostly covers political topics with a panel of typically three guests. Depending on the topic covered in a given week, number of guests goes up to five or down to a single guest.

Starting out on Studio B, a regional broadcaster for the city of Belgrade and its outlying area, in 1991 during the beginning stages of the dissolution of SFR Yugoslavia, Utisak nedelje bore witness to many of the geopolitical events affecting the area in the following decade, gaining high viewership and loyal following. Since 1997, its production has been handled by "PG Mreža", a production company headed by Zoran Ostojić and Lila Radonjić. In 2002, the show switched to RTV B92, a national broadcast TV channel, where it aired until 2014 when it was politically removed. In 2019, the show returned to TV channels, airing on Nova S.

History

2013–14 season
What would turn out to be Utisak nedelje'''s last season on-air began on 2 September 2013 with a single guest — Serbian prime minister Ivica Dačić.

Two months later on 12 November, first deputy prime minister Aleksandar Vučić, rumoured to be the biggest political authority in Serbia ever since the May 2012 elections, came on for the very first time as a single guest. That particular show featured another first; instead of its usual Sunday evening timeslot, it aired live on a Tuesday due to B92's live coverage the previous two days of Novak Djokovic's participation at the ATP World Tour Finals in London. The topics of conversation varied from possible SNS candidates for the new mayor of Belgrade after the SNS-engineered ousting of DS president Dragan Đilas from the mayoral post, Minister of Energy Zorana Mihajlović's perceived obstruction of the South Stream natural gas pipeline project, to the government's proclaimed tough stance on tycoons as exemplified through the prosecution of Miroslav Mišković. Things got testy at times with Vučić losing his cool at several Bećković's remarks, at one point even accusing her of spending 90% of her last 55 shows on smearing him via suggestions he's developing a dictatorship and fostering his own personality cult.

January 2014 guest appearance by Aleksandar Vučić
First deputy PM Vučić returned some two months later on 26 January 2014, again as a single guest, in anticipation of the 2014 parliamentary election. His appearance came about unexpectedly since two days earlier on Friday, 24 January, Minister of Economy Saša Radulović had been announced as guest. One day before the show, 25 January, Radulović resigned his cabinet post and then didn't appear as guest on Utisak nedelje without an explanation. Instead, first deputy PM Vučić came on the programme. In another testy and awkward conversation that at times turned outright hostile, Bećković pressed Vučić on the reasons new elections are being called, Radulović's resignation, and the abandoned, supposedly reformist, labour law while evasive Vučić accused Bećković of bias, suggesting several times she is "framing the discussion to suit the current political needs of the Democratic Party (DS)" and is basing her questions on their press-releases.

Nine months later, on 28 October 2014, Bećković, at this point no longer on the air, revealed what went on behind the scenes that weekend in late January: "Radulović was coming on Utisak nedelje because he wanted to announce his resignation live on air that Sunday. When the B92 director saw the promos announcing Radulović as guest, she called me telling me 'please, this can't happen, Vučić is losing it, cancel Radulović immediately, find a way to break it to him' to which I told her 'OK, I can tell him he's been banned from appearing on Utisak on B92 at this particular time because Vučić has a problem with it', which is obviously not what she wanted me to tell him. Meanwhile, that Saturday morning Vučić dissolved the cabinet, effectively announcing new elections for March while his people offered me an exclusive with him a day later on Utisak. So Radulović's resignation suddenly became less important story news-wise. Still, I think I never felt more shame in my 25 years as a journalist than that day [for dropping Radulović]. Vučić came on instead of Radulović and the first deputy PM and I had that now-infamous interview. The day after the show, Vučić called me on my phone and told me 'congratulations, you humiliated me in front an audience of millions' and that was the last time we talked".Olja Bećković: “Vučić ovde, da više nikad nisi okrenula moj broj!;istinomer.rs, 28 October 2014

September 2014 removal from B92
In mid-September 2014, prior to the beginning of the show's 24th season on air, information appeared in Serbian media about Utisak nedelje leaving B92 and possibly ending for good. Apparently, B92 management wanted the show moved from its country-wide terrestrial channel TV B92 to its cable outfit B92 Info, all of which Bećković and her production team at PG Mreža vehemently rejected, insisting on their contract with B92 until 1 March 2015 to be honoured in full, including the strict stipulation of having the show air on the main terrestrial channel. Simultaneously, a report also appeared in the Kurir tabloid, based "on sources close to the TV Pink owner Željko Mitrović", that Bećković has an offer of moving the show to TV Pink, a transfer that reportedly included "complete editorial freedom, €5,000 monthly salary, and the pick of any timeslot on Pink's schedule". Next day, the tabloid followed up with another report from an unnamed source close to Mitrović, this time claiming that in addition to all of the earlier stated offer terms, Mitrović is also willing to give Bećković the percentage from the show sponsors as well as lucrative ratings bonuses, all of which Mitrović himself confirmed when contacted by Kurir. Bećković's legal representative denied any contact with TV Pink, insisting she is under a valid and binding contract with B92.

The acrimony appeared to have died down a bit over the following days, especially once information appeared that B92 had apparently agreed to honour the terms of its contract with the show's producers and the start of a new season of Utisak nedelje had been scheduled for Sunday, 28 September as confirmed by the network's news division head Veran Matić.

However, on 26 September, two days before the show's 24th season was scheduled to begin, B92's PR department put out a press release saying that the "airing of Utisak nedelje is being suspended until further notice due to failure to reach an agreement between the B92 management on one side and the Mreža production company and the show's author Olja Bećković on the other". The press release continued by claiming "Mreža and Bećković turned down the B92 management's offer of having Utisak nedelje air on the terrestrial channel until November 2014 before moving to become the leading format on the B92 Info cable channel all in an effort to have the cult series and its author's longstanding reputation contribute to the development of B92's cable news platform", before adding that the negotiations between the two sides are ongoing. Several hours later, commenting the B92's press release, Bećković said to the Beta news agency: "Utisak nedelje didn't get suspended until further notice, it got banned. And I didn't turn down an offer, I turned down an ultimatum. They blackmailed me by telling me that the only way to continue under the terms of the current contract that's valid until March 2015 is to sign off on the show's move to B92 Info in November 2014. This is not a business decision, they were carrying out a political dictate".

Reaction

Coming on the heels of the -hosted Sarapin problem, another long-running political talk-show that had been perceived as critical of the ruling Serbian Progressive Party (SNS), being removed from the Studio B airwaves, the B92's decision to drop Utisak nedelje from its schedule caused a lot of reaction in Serbia.

The biggest opposition party, DS, put out a release saying that "the whole episode is a disturbing warning that recalls the days of the coaxial cable-gate", referring to the infamous scandal from the 1990s when the Slobodan Milošević-led authorities regularly resorted to jamming the signals of TV stations critical of their policies, a practice that was on one occasion cynically explained as "water getting into the coaxial cable".

The journalists' groups and trade unions operating in Serbia, UNS, NUNS, PROUNS, and SINOS, all put out releases condemning the action by B92.

Astonko, a limited-liability company that holds majority stake in B92, put out a release of its own stating "Utisak nedelje wasn't banned", adding that "any such interpretation of the inability on the part of Bećković and B92 management to reach an agreement over the airing of her show is baseless and malicious".

For her part, over the next few days, Bećković gave print interviews to Frankfurtske Vesti, Politika, Blic, and Radio Free Europe/Radio Liberty's Serbian service as well as television appearances on Danica Vučenić's Jedan na jedan programme on RTV and on Al Jazeera Balkans' Kontekst programme hosted by Anne-Marie Ćurčić, saying:  Asked to comment the supposed lucrative offer by Željko Mitrović of moving Utisak to TV Pink, Bećković responded: 

Consisting of journalists Brankica Stanković, Miodrag Čvorović, Mirjana Jevtović, Irena Stević, Jasmina Pašić, and Ivan Angelovski, the production team of Insajder, a B92 investigative programme whose latest series began airing on 21 September, reacted as well in a press release saying it "disagrees with the B92 owners' decision to keep insisting on moving Utisak nedelje to B92 Info in November 2014". The Insajder team also shared their own recent experiences with B92: "Seeing that we can't imagine a future for Insajder on a channel that completely commercialized its content and considering B92's publicly stated intent of transforming the B92 Info cable channel into a sound news source with original content, two weeks ago we already asked the B92 ownership and management to allow us, the Insajder team, to take over the B92 Info's editorial duties and launch the transformed cable channel in January 2015. The owners' insistence for this transformation to happen in November 2014, despite the fact that no credible news concept can be implemented on such short notice, raises logical doubt whether their goal is creating a serious news channel or is this just a ploy to dump away first Utisak nedelje and then other B92 news programmes like Insajder and Kažiprst?"

Sunday, 28 September at 9pm, the time Utisak nedelje's new season was supposed to start, a group of some 200 people showed up in silent protest in front of the B92 building in New Belgrade, including DS politicians Bojan Pajtić, Dragan Šutanovac, and Borko Stefanović, LDP president Čedomir Jovanović, former politician and diplomat Vesna Pešić, author , film director and SPS MP Srđan Dragojević, film director and producer Dragan Bjelogrlić, actor Branimir Brstina, journalists Antonela Riha and Danica Vučenić, etc.

In his Radio Free Europe/Radio Liberty online column,  labeled the removal of Bećković from B92 "a gradual and soft strangulation of a popular pluralistic public forum", seeing it as "part of the process that has been going on for two years in Serbia already: the process of the SNS-led authorities systematically assuming complete control over vital news streams in the country, all the while being extremely cooperative, servile even, with the West thereby getting some much-needed room to maneuver when it comes to achieving their ultimate goal — the all-encompassing occupation of the Serbian political scene and public sphere".

On 2 October, B92 put out yet another press release, this time reacting to Bećković's interviews. The release accuses Bećković of "not only showing a lack of understanding, but also committing a gross violation of professional ethics in an obvious attempt to discredit the B92 company", before stating that "this is especially disappointing considering the company invested around €2 million in her over the previous 12 years". The release concludes by accusing Bećković and PG Mreža of intentionally creating a negative atmosphere, smearing B92's reputation, and exerting pressure on the company's editorial policy in an effort of gaining a better negotiating position for themselves. The same day, B92 news director Veran Matić distanced himself from the release saying he did not take part in writing it. The day also saw the Serbian defense minister and the Serbian Progressive Party vice-president Bratislav Gašić chime in, saying "Prime Minister Aleksandar Vučić isn't afraid of any TV show and is not in any way connected to this" in response to the DS member of parliament Borko Stefanović's claims that the show got removed on prime minister's instructions.

Both Bećković and PG Mreža reacted to the 2 October B92 release, contesting its claims."Utisak nedelje": Šta je B92 hteo da kaže u današnjem saopštenju?;Blic, 2 October 2014

European Federation of Journalists (EFJ), a branch of the International Federation of Journalists (IFJ), joined their Serbian affiliates UNS, NUNS, and SINOS in protesting B92's decision to drop Utisak nedelje, saying it "very much smells like censorship".

Film director Emir Kusturica expressed public support for Bećković during a guest appearance on Milomir Marić's Ćirilica talk show on 6 October, calling the removal of Utisak nedelje "a grave mistake". Kusturica reiterated his support for Bećković in a Blic interview a month later, saying: "I don't care whether it was business or politics nor am I interested in personal relations between Olja and Vučić. That our social arena suddenly has no place for her is terrible and it spoils the image of the city of Belgrade, a city that in her TV programme had a speaker's corner where current events would receive the final take and analysis. She has a place in our public sphere and I'm hoping some broadcaster, like RTS, will give her the space she deserves".

In his mid-October interview for Danas, veteran Croatian journalist Goran Milić, currently performing the program director role at the pan-Balkan Al Jazeera Balkans, came out saying he does not see censorship in the case of Olja Bećković's Utisak nedelje'' being removed from B92.

2019 return on Nova S
In April 2019, Utisak nedelje began to air every Sunday evening on cable TV channel "Nova S".

References

Serbian television talk shows
1991 Serbian television series debuts
RTV Studio B original programming